Night markets or night bazaars are street markets which operate at night and are generally dedicated to more leisurely strolling, shopping, and eating than more businesslike day markets. They are typically open-air markets popular in East Asia, Southeast Asia, and Chinatowns in several other regions of the world.

History
The concept of the night market traces its roots back to the medieval Chinese Tang dynasty. The Tang government put strict sanctions on night markets and their operations in A.D. 836. Towards the end of the Tang Dynasty, economic expansion led to less state regulation and restrictions being lifted on night markets. During the Song Dynasty (960-1279), night markets played a central role in Chinese nightlife. These markets were found in corners of large cities. Some stayed open for twenty-four hours. Song period night markets are also known to have included restaurants and brothels due to being frequently located near business districts and red light districts.

Geographical spread
Night markets are popular in Chinese culture; they are especially common in East and Southeast Asia, found in China, Hong Kong, Macau, as well as Overseas Chinese communities across Taiwan, Thailand, Cambodia, Vietnam, Singapore, Malaysia, Indonesia to the Philippines. Nevertheless, night markets are more prominent within ethnic Chinese economic and cultural activities. Some well-known night markets exist in Taipei, Kaohsiung, Shanghai, Beijing, Guangzhou, Hong Kong, Singapore, and Bangkok, but they also exist in Chinatowns worldwide.

Taiwan

Taiwan has over 700 night markets.  The larger and more formal of these markets might take place in purpose-built marketplaces while smaller or more informal ones tend to occupy streets or roads that are normal thoroughfares by day. The temporal night markets (ones that are not housed in any permanent structure) are actually consistent in their location; in most large cities, they are on a smaller street parallel and close (a block or two away) to the primary street of that city. Though the temporal night market stalls appear at night and then vanish by day, the vendors usually return to the same location the next evening. Night markets do not close, but the individual stalls may randomly take days off due to holidays, family illness, etc.  Most temporal stalls within a night market have white canvas tops and bright lights. This gives the temporary night markets a fantastical, carnival-like atmosphere.

When a new night market street develops, the initial response is not always positive – they are thought to be noisy and the customers often leave trash behind that the owners of the daytime stores must deal with.  As the night market becomes more well known, however, often it is looked upon more positively and the daytime stores adjust.  The daytime stores then stay open later, because there are now customers at night when previously there wouldn't be.  Night markets can increase profitability and often bring secondary type of consumers that are different from the daytime consumers.  For example, a daytime store may normally sell herbs. At night, that same daytime store may now change its wares to include iced grass jelly and honey tea; this second item caters towards the teenage and early-twenties crowd, which is the majority of night market customers.  Although some of these markets are specialized (e.g., in certain types of food), most have a mixture of individual stalls hawking clothing, consumer goods, xiaochi (snacks or fast food), and specialty drinks. The atmosphere is usually crowded and noisy with hawkers shouting and fast-paced music playing over loudspeakers. Some individual vendors may take advantage of the informality of the market to offer counterfeit, pirated or grey market consumer goods. The night markets usually open around 6pm, and are busy until past midnight.

Major night markets often have agreements and contracts where the vendors pitch in for utilities such as electricity and water hook-up.  A few (such as Shilin Night Market) actually include the cost of basic cleaning in this price.  There is also a greater police presence at major night markets, compared to the temporary night markets.

Brunei, Indonesia, Malaysia, and Singapore

Night markets are commonly known as Pasar Malam by the locals, which literally means night market, "pasar" being related to "bazaar" in Persian or also the meaning "market" in Malay/Indonesian, and "malam" meaning "night". A pasar malam is a street market in Indonesia, Malaysia and Singapore that opens in the evening, usually in residential neighbourhoods.

It brings together a collection of stalls that usually sell goods such as fruit, vegetables, snacks, toys, clothes, movie discs and ornaments at cheap or at least reasonable prices. A pasar malam often takes place only one to a few days of the week, as the traders rotate around different neighbourhoods on different days of the week. Haggling over prices is a common practice at such markets.

Today, several kecamatan (district) in Jakarta and also other provinces in Indonesia, hold weekly pasar malam, usually held every Saturday night in nearby alun-alun square, open fields or marketplaces. In Indonesia, pasar malam has become a weekly recreational place for local families. Other than selling variety of goods and foods, some pasar malam also offer kiddy rides and carnival games, such as mini carousel or mini train ride.

New Zealand

Night markets are popular in Auckland, the biggest city in New Zealand, Wellington, the capital city of New Zealand, and in small regional cities and towns like  Hamilton, Flaxmere and  Waitara. The first night market in Auckland was opened in 2010 in Pakuranga. By 2019, night markets can be found in Auckland seven nights a week. Typically, night markets in Auckland are being held in shopping mall carparks. They offer food from Asia and Europe, as well as Māori and Pacific cuisines. There are also specialist  pop-up night markets that serve one kind of food (such as noodles). In 2019, food delivery services from Auckland night markets were also introduced. In 2020, during the  COVID-19 pandemic, the night markets in Auckland introduced the use of an  app for contactless orders and payments so that social distancing can be managed.

North America
Night markets are also hosted in various areas of North America, particularly with large Overseas Chinese communities in the Pacific Northwest and the West Coast, with Taiwanese-American student organizations hosting annual night market events to emulate the jovial atmosphere and celebrate the unique culture of night markets. In San Francisco's Chinatown, a large night market with almost 100 booths takes place every autumn Saturday in Portsmouth Square. In Chinatown in Vancouver, British Columbia, large night markets take place every Friday, Saturday, and Sunday from May to September, as well as in an industrial area near suburban Richmond, BC's Golden Village; the Richmond Night Market features more than 400 booths and attracts in excess of 30,000 people per night (total attendance in 2005 was almost two million). Night It Up! (formerly Toronto Night Market and Asian Night Market), has been and continues to be Power Unit Youth Organization's flagship project, attracting hundreds of thousands to a three-day celebration of Asian food and culture in Markham, Ontario (attendance was over 130,000 in 2017). The 626 Night Market, held at Santa Anita Park in Arcadia, California, a suburb of Los Angeles, is stated to be the largest Asian night market in the United States. The Food Trust in Philadelphia operates a unique variant of a night market, with it being a temporary event only active for one night before moving somewhere else in the city; the market has thus far been held in East Passyunk, South Street, Northern Liberties, Mount Airy, Old City, Chinatown, and other places across the city. The Queens Night Market is held in Flushing Meadows Corona Park in New York City on Saturdays from April to October. It hosts as many as 100 vendors.

See also

 Bangkok's Suan Lum Night Bazaar
 Chiang Mai Night Bazaar
 Night markets in Hong Kong
 Seoul's Dongdaemun Market
 Street food
 Taipei's Shilin Night Market

References

Further reading 
Shuenn-Der Yu "Hot and Noisy: Taiwan's Night Market Culture" in The Minor Arts of Daily Life: Popular Culture in Taiwan David K. Jordan, Andrew D. Morris, and Marc L. Moskowitz, (eds.), Honolulu: Univ. of Hawai'i Press, 2004.

External links
 Ministry of Foreign Affairs website about Night Markets in Taiwan
 Taiwan Tourism Bureau Special Interests > Night Markets  
 San Francisco Chinatown Night Market
 Vancouver Night Market
  Vancouver Chinatown Night Market
 Richmond Summer Night Market
 Night It Up!
 Video of a walk through a night market in the Central Chinese city of Yichang

Articles containing video clips
Chinese culture
Chinese inventions
Culture of Hong Kong
Night in culture
 
Retail markets
Taiwanese culture
Tang dynasty